Gruijters or De Gruijter is a Dutch-language occupational surname. A gruijter or gruiter is an archaic name for someone hulling grains to produce groats or for one using these for brewing. Like most Dutch names with an "ij" digraph, the name is often spelled with a "y". People with this surname include:

  (1789–1864), Dutch nun and founder of a congregation
 Hans Gruijters (1925–1980), Dutch bank robber and murderer
 Hans Gruijters (1931–2005), Dutch politician, co-founder of D66
 James Gruijters (born 1993), Dutch cricketer
 Pieter Gruijters (born 1968), Dutch Paralympian
 Tim Gruijters (born 1991), Dutch cricketer
De Gruijter
 Jochem de Gruijter (born 1978), Dutch volleyball player
 Walter de Gruyter (1862–1923), German merchant and publisher

References

Dutch-language surnames
Occupational surnames